Runaway Daughters is a 1956 film drama. It was loosely remade in 1994. The film was released by American International Pictures as a double feature with Shake, Rattle and Rock.

Plot
Audrey Barton is the teen daughter of rich, irresponsible parents. When school classmate Tommy brings her home from a date, they spy on Ruth Barton, her mother, passionately kissing a neighbor.

Audrey's girlfriends have troubled home lives, too. Mary Rubach has a strict father who doesn't approve of her boyfriend Bob being 20. Angie Forrest's mother is off honeymooning with a third husband. Angie is glad when her brother Tony pays a visit, bringing along his girl, Dixie Jackson.

Tommy tattles at school about what he saw Audrey's mother do. Taunted by another girl at school, Audrey gets into a fight and is expelled, putting her graduation at risk. Ruth shows no concern whatsoever with her daughter's dilemma, telling her that finding a man is more important than getting an education anyway. George Barton displays little interest in his daughter's situation, either.

Bob joins the Army and urges Mary to elope, but her dad beats him up. Angie's brother leaves for Los Angeles, leaving her depressed. When a birthday party for Audrey is spoiled by the grown-ups, spiking the punch with gin, Audrey's had enough. She takes her gift from her parents, a new convertible, picks up Mary and Angie and the three girls head for L.A., running away from home.

Knowing the police will be looking for them, the girls ditch Audrey's car and steal one. They look up Tony and Dixie, who find the girls jobs in a seedy dance hall. A remorseful Ruth hires a private detective to find her daughter. The cops come looking, too, investigating the stolen car, which Angie speeds off in, right over a cliff, resulting in her death.

Mary's dad relents, letting her join Bob at his army base. Audrey returns home, her mother promising that things there will be better.

Cast
 Marla English as Audrey
 Anna Sten as Ruth
 Lance Fuller as Tony
 Adele Jergens as Dixie
 Gloria Castillo as Angie
 John Litel as Mr. Barton
 Steve Terrell as Bob
 Mary Ellen Kay as Mary
 Frank Gorshin as Tommy

Production
The script was allegedly based on an incident that writer Lou Rusoff came across when he worked as a social worker.

Anna Sten came out of retirement to make the movie. Tom Conway had a stroke during filming and was replaced by John Litel. The film was shot in nine days, only running two and a half hours into overtime.|author=Male lead Steve Terrell was signed to a long-term contract by Arkoff for 15 films.

See also
List of American films of 1956

References

External links

Films directed by Edward L. Cahn
1956 crime drama films
1956 films
American International Pictures films
Films scored by Ronald Stein
American crime drama films
American black-and-white films
1950s English-language films
1950s American films